Sellwood may refer to:

 Sellwood, Portland, Oregon, a Portland neighborhood
 Sellwood Bridge, a bridge in Portland
 Sellwood Park, a park in southeast Portland
 Sellwood Riverfront Park, a park in southeast Portland
 Sellwood Branch YMCA, a structure listed on the National Register of Historic Places
 Sellwood, Ontario, a village

People with the surname
 Joe Sellwood (1911–2007), Australian rules footballer
 John Sellwood (died 1892), Oregon pioneer
 Neville Sellwood (1922−1962), Australian jockey

See also
Selwood (disambiguation)